Lindsay Davenport and Mary Joe Fernández were the defending champions but only Davenport competed that year with Martina Hingis.

Davenport and Hingis won in the final 6–1, 6–3 against Conchita Martínez and Patricia Tarabini.

Seeds
Champion seeds are indicated in bold text while text in italics indicates the round in which those seeds were eliminated.

 Lindsay Davenport /  Martina Hingis (champions)
 Lori McNeil /  Caroline Vis (first round)
 Conchita Martínez /  Patricia Tarabini (final)
 Rika Hiraki /  Naoko Kijimuta (first round)

Draw

External links
 1997 Bank of the West Classic Doubles draw

Silicon Valley Classic
1997 WTA Tour